Kiomourtzou is a small village in Cyprus located along the main Kyrenia–Nicosia highway. De facto, it is under the control of Northern Cyprus. Its population in 2011 was 67.

References

Communities in Kyrenia District
Populated places in Girne District